Benno Janssen (March 12, 1874 – October 14, 1964) was an American architect.

Childhood, education and career
Benno Janssen was born in St. Louis, Missouri, the son of Oscar Janssen and Thekla Susenbeth.  Janssen studied at the University of Kansas. In 1899, he began working in architecture in Boston, Massachusetts. He also continued his studies at the Massachusetts Institute of Technology. In 1902, Janssen headed for Paris, France, and further studied at the École des Beaux-Arts. In 1905, he returned to the United States to work in Pittsburgh, Pennsylvania, for the architectural firm MacClure & Spahr. Janssen left that firm, along with Franklin Abbott, to form their own partnership in 1906, Janssen & Abbott, which remained active until Abbott's retirement in 1918. Janssen next joined with William York Cocken in 1922, and together they started the architectural firm Janssen & Cocken.

Architectural work - commercial

He is best known for monumental buildings such as the Pittsburgh Athletic Association (1911), the Masonic Temple (1915 - now Alumni Hall of the University of Pittsburgh), William Penn Hotel (1916 and again in 1928), Mellon Institute (1937), the Longue Vue Club (1923), Rolling Rock Club and Stables (1928 - near Ligonier, Pennsylvania), the T.W. Phillips Gas & Oil Company (Butler, Pennsylvania), the Keystone Athletic Club (1929 - now Lawrence Hall of Point Park University), and the Washington Crossing Bridge (Pittsburgh), also called the 40th Street Bridge (1924).

Architectural work - residential
Janssen also designed many fine residences, including the country estate of George Calvert (1912); the Lee L. Chandler House (1924) in Shadyside; Elm Court, the estate of B.D. Phillips in Butler, Pennsylvania (1929); as well as Fox Chapel's Frank B. Ingersoll House (1931) and La Tourelle, the Edgar J. Kaufmann house (1923). Janssen received many Kaufmann commissions over the years.

The prevailing architectural motif of these Benno Janssen homes was a picturesquely irregular configuration of buildings rambling around a central courtyard.  Other features these homes shared include: complex slate roofs with many gables, large groups of rectangular windows, rich oriel and bay windows, interesting chimney treatments, and intricately carved stone detailing.

Many of Janssen's buildings also boast museum-quality wrought-iron by noted Philadelphia artisan Samuel Yellin. Janssen collaborated with Yellin for 25 years, resulting in gracious iron details in his most important projects.

Personal life

Benno Janssen married Edith Patton, the daughter of Central Pennsylvania businessman and future State Senator Alexander Ennis Patton and Mary Boynton Dill, on December 28, 1889, in Curwensville, Clearfield County, Pennsylvania.  The Janssens were the parents of Mary Patton Janssen, Benno Janssen, Jr. and Alexander Patton Janssen.

Janssen retired in 1939 and died in Charlottesville, Virginia, October 14, 1964.

Photo gallery of works

References

Family information courtesy of AnGenealogy by Angelynn Jane Rainbow on rootsweb.com

1874 births
1964 deaths
American people of Dutch descent
19th-century American architects
Architects from Pittsburgh
20th-century American architects
University of Kansas alumni
Massachusetts Institute of Technology alumni